Konrad Wrzesiński (born 10 September 1993) is a Polish professional footballer playing as a midfielder for Polish club Zagłębie Sosnowiec. Besides Poland, he has played in Kazakhstan.

Career

Club
On 22 January 2019, Wrzesiński signed for Kazakhstan Premier League club Kairat. He won the national championship with this club.

On 16 March 2021, he signed for Ekstraklasa club Jagiellonia Białystok until June 2023.

On 1 September 2021, Wrzesiński was loaned to Stal Mielec for one year.

On 31 December 2022, he terminated his contract with Jagiellonia.

Shortly after, on 5 January 2023, I liga club Zagłębie Sosnowiec announced they have re-signed Wrzesiński on a deal until June 2024.

Career statistics

Honours

Club
Kairat
Kazakhstan Premier League: 2020

References

External links
 
 

1993 births
Living people
People from Pułtusk
Association football midfielders
Polish footballers
Ekstraklasa players
I liga players
II liga players
III liga players
Zagłębie Sosnowiec players
FC Kairat players
Polonia Warsaw players
Motor Lublin players
Widzew Łódź players
MKP Pogoń Siedlce players
Jagiellonia Białystok players
Stal Mielec players
Polish expatriate footballers
Expatriate footballers in Kazakhstan
Polish expatriate sportspeople in Kazakhstan